Chlorhoda metamelaena is a moth of the subfamily Arctiinae first described by Paul Dognin in 1913. It is found in Colombia.

References

Arctiini